This is a list of the Spanish PROMUSICAE Top 20 Singles number-ones of 2001.

Chart history

See also
2001 in music
List of number-one hits (Spain)

References

2001
Spain Singles
Number-one singles